Dawar Bakhsh (died 23 January 1628), which means "God Given", was the ruler of the Mughal Empire for a short time between 1627–1628, immediately after the death of his grandfather Jahangir (r. 1605–1627).

Dawar was the child of Jahangir's eldest son, Prince Khusrau, who was killed at the behest of Prince Khurram (Shah Jahan) in 1622.

Dawar, who was affectionately nicknamed "Bulaqi" (meaning "Nose-ring"), was initially named the Diwan of the Dakhin, and later Governor of Gujarat in 1622 by his grandfather, Jahangir. However, being only fifteen years old at this point, the prince was placed under the guardianship of his maternal grandfather, Mirza Aziz Koka.

Upon the death of his grandfather, he became a pawn in the political game to seize the Mughal throne. He was declared the Mughal Emperor by Asaf Khan as a stopgap arrangement to counter the claims of the Nur Jahan, who wanted Shahryar to succeed.

Dawar's ascension and death
Upon the death of Jahangir, in order to secure the accession of Shah Jahan, Asaf Khan, the brother of Nur Jehan, brought Dawar Baksh out of confinement, declared him king and sent him to Lahore.

However, Nur Jahan favoured Jahangir's youngest son, Shahriyar, to ascend, and since he was in Lahore at the time, he ascended to the throne, captured state treasury and, in an attempt to secure his throne, distributed over 70 lakh rupees amongst old and new noblemen. Meanwhile, Mirza Baisinghar, son of the late Prince Daniyal, on the death of the Emperor, fled to Lahore, and joined Shahryar.

The two forces met near Lahore. Shahryar lost the battle and fled into the fort, where the next morning he was presented in front of Dawar Baksh, who placed him in confinement.

On Jumada-l awwal 2, 1037 AH (30 December 1627) Shah Jahan was proclaimed Emperor at Lahore, and on Jumada-l awwal 26, 1037 AH (23 January 1628)  on his orders, Dawar,  his brother Garshásp, Shahryar, and Tahmuras and Hoshang, sons of the deceased Prince Daniyal, were all put to death.

However, there are some suggestions that Dawar had managed to avoid this fate and escaped to Persia. As late as 1633, ambassadors from the Duchy of Holstein claimed to have encountered him there, and the French glassmaker Tavernier went so far as to state that he had conversed and dined with the prince.

Ancestry

References

Mughal princes
1628 deaths
Executed royalty
Year of birth unknown
1603 births
Timurid dynasty
Subahdars of Gujarat